Herbert Meyer is the name of:

 Herbert Oskar Meyer (1875–1941), German jurist and historian
 Herbert Alton Meyer (1886–1950), U.S. Representative
Herbert Meyer, film director of Bad Boy (1939 film)
 Herbert Meyer (footballer) (born 1948), German footballer
 Herbert E. Meyer, author and former vice chairman of the CIA's National Intelligence Council

See also 
 Herbert Mayr (1943–2015), former politician from South Tyrol
 Herbert Meier (born 1928), Swiss writer and translator
 H. V. Meyerowitz (Herbert V. Meyerowitz, 1900–1945), artist, educator and British colonial administrator in Africa